West Monkseaton is a Tyne and Wear Metro station, serving the village of Earsdon and suburb of Monkseaton, North Tyneside in Tyne and Wear, England. It joined the network on 11 August 1980, following the opening of the first phase of the network, between Haymarket and Tynemouth via Four Lane Ends.

History
Monkseaton had been served by a station since 1864.

The station opened in March 1933, as part of the London and North Eastern Railway, with the station building constructed in Art Deco style. The station's platforms took just a month to build after plans were approved.

The reinforced concrete Art Deco station building is attributed to the London and North Eastern Railway architect, H. H. Powell. Work on the station building, however, did not begin until 1934. Staircases and ramps led down from this building to two timber platforms, both of which featured waiting rooms. The westbound platform featured a concrete canopy, which was added by the London and North Eastern Railway, following the construction of the waiting rooms.

Prior to the station's closure for conversion in the late 1970s, the station generally received a service every 20 minutes in both directions, on the Coast Circle route. The service from West Monkseaton to Newcastle via South Gosforth was removed in January 1978, in order to facilitate conversion work on the stations to the west. This meant that the station was briefly a terminus for trains from Newcastle via Tynemouth, with trains reversing using a crossover to the west of the station.

The station closed for conversion in September 1979, ahead of opening as part of the Tyne and Wear Metro network, re-opening in August 1980. Conversion work saw the loss of the wooden station buildings at platform level, as well as the replacement of the timber platforms with shorter concrete ones. The canopy on the westbound platform (trains towards St. James) was retained, while a smaller canopy in a similar style was added to the eastbound platform (trains towards South Shields).

The original street-level entrance building remains, and was refurbished in 1999, along with the original London and North Eastern Railway platform canopy. As part of this refurbishment, an art installation by Richard Talbot, Bridge, was commissioned. It features a number of coloured stained glass windows, and is located in the station's ticket hall, overlooking the track and platforms.

West Monkseaton was recently refurbished, along with Cullercoats and Monkseaton, in 2018, as part of the Metro: All Change programme. The refurbishment involved the installation of new seating and lighting, resurfaced platforms, and improved security and accessibility. The station was also painted in to the new black and white corporate colour scheme.

Facilities
Step-free access is available at all stations across the Tyne and Wear Metro network, with ramped access to both platforms. The station is equipped with ticket machines, waiting shelter, seating, next train information displays, timetable posters, and an emergency help point on both platforms. Ticket machines are able to accept payment with credit and debit card (including contactless payment), notes and coins. The station is also fitted with smartcard validators, which feature at all stations across the network.

There is no dedicated car parking available at the station. There is the provision for cycle parking, with three cycle lockers and five cycle pods available for use.

Services 
, the station is served by up to five trains per hour on weekdays and Saturday, and up to four trains per hour during the evening and on Sunday.

Rolling stock used: Class 599 Metrocar

References

External links
 
 Timetable and station information for West Monkseaton

Metropolitan Borough of North Tyneside
1933 establishments in England
Railway stations in Great Britain opened in 1933
1980 establishments in England
Railway stations in Great Britain opened in 1980
Tyne and Wear Metro Yellow line stations
Transport in Tyne and Wear
Art Deco architecture in England
Former London and North Eastern Railway stations
